Ashen is a first-person shooter video game for N-Gage developed by Torus Games and published by Nokia in 2004. It was first shown to the public at Cebit 2004.

Gameplay
The game is divided into 8 levels, which, for a handheld, are enormous in size and structure. Levels take place in a prison, over rooftops, a city-scape, and even in the sewers. The environments are quite varied and is one of the best performing FPS titles on the N-Gage. 

There are 9 different weapons available in the game, including 2x pistols, alien weapons, MG, sniper rifle, and a rocket launcher. Unfortunately, enemy variety is lacking.

There is also the ability to enter your score in the game into the N-Gage Arena. A direct Multipayer over GPRS is unfortunately not present. The game offers an offline multiplayer mode for up to four players, however only four levels are selectable. Nevertheless, they offer a lot of fun for multiplayer fans.

Story
In Seven River City, mysterious phenomena begin to happen. Jacob Ward, along with all of the residents, flee the city. Jacobs sister did not make it out, however, and he decides to return to save her.

Reception

The game received "mixed" reviews according to the review aggregation website Metacritic.

References

External links
 Official Website in the Webarchive

External links
 

2004 video games
First-person shooters
N-Gage games
Video games developed in Australia
Multiplayer and single-player video games
Nokia games
Torus Games games